Jimaguayú is a municipality and town in the Camagüey Province of Cuba.

Demographics
In 2004, the municipality of Jimaguayú had a population of 21,169.

See also
Jimaguayú Municipal Museum
List of cities in Cuba
Municipalities of Cuba

References

External links

Populated places in Camagüey Province